South Bank is a cultural, social, educational and recreational precinct in Brisbane, Queensland, Australia. The precinct is located in the suburb of South Brisbane, on the southern bank of the Brisbane River.

Landmarks

South Bank Parklands

The South Bank Parklands, which were established on the former site of World Expo 88, are one of Brisbane's most popular tourist attractions. The parklands are home to many restaurants and cafés as well as landmarks such as the Queensland Conservatorium, the Wheel of Brisbane, the Nepalese Peace Pagoda, Streets Beach (a free man-made swimming area), and the Grand Arbour. Approximately 11,000,000 people visit the South Bank Parklands each year.

Grey Street & Little Stanley Street

A number of Brisbane's most popular restaurants and fashion boutiques are located on Grey Street, and Little Stanley Street which it runs parallel to. The South Bank Cinemas are also located on Grey Street, along with two five star hotels.

Brisbane Convention and Exhibition Centre

The Brisbane Convention & Exhibition Centre contains 44 meeting and event spaces, including four exhibition halls with a combined area of 20,000 m² and three stand alone tiered auditora. The venue has received 126 major industry awards, making it the most awarded convention centre in Australia. The centre has also been ranked among the top three convention centres world-wide by the Association Internationale des Palais de Congres (AIPC) on three separate occasions. The centre was also host to the G20 Leaders Summit in November 2014.

Queensland Maritime Museum

The Queensland Maritime Museum is located next to the Goodwill Bridge at the southern end of the South Bank Parklands. It houses a two level exhibition building, a library, a dry dock, a lighthouse and several retired vessels.

Queensland Cultural Centre

The Queensland Cultural Centre consists of:
The Queensland Performing Arts Centre
The Queensland Museum and Science Centre
The Queensland Art Gallery
The Queensland Gallery of Modern Art
The State Library of Queensland

Griffith University

Griffith University has three campus facilities present in South Bank:
The Queensland Conservatorium of Music, including the home of Opera Queensland
The Griffith Film School
The Queensland College of Art.

Transport
Public transport is conveniently located, with Brisbane TransLink's Ferry, Bus and Train services all being readily available.

 Ferries — CityCat and CityFerry on the Brisbane River at South Bank
 Buses — from South Bank busway station and Cultural Centre busway station
 Trains — from South Bank and South Brisbane railway stations

Gallery

References

External links 

 Brisbane River and Southbank Photographs 2006, State Library of Queensland

Buildings and structures in Brisbane
Tourist attractions in Brisbane